Brookland is a city in Craighead County, Arkansas, United States. The population was 1,642 at the 2010 census. It is included in the Jonesboro, Arkansas Metropolitan Statistical Area.

Geography
Brookland is located in northern Craighead County at  (35.902386, -90.581591).

List of highways 

 
 Highway 1
 Highway 230

Demographics

2020 census

As of the 2020 United States census, there were 4,064 people, 1,337 households, and 945 families residing in the city.

2000 census
As of the census of 2000, there were 1,332 people, 499 households, and 384 families residing in the town. The population density was 1,220.1 inhabitants per square mile (471.8/km2). The racial makeup of the town was 97.52% White, 0.68% Black or African American, 0.38% Native American, 0.68% from other races, and 0.75% from two or more races.  1.05% of the population were Hispanic or Latino of any race.

There were 499 households, out of which 43.7% had children under the age of 18 living with them, 59.3% were married couples living together, 14.4% had a female householder with no husband present, and 23.0% were non-families. 19.6% of all households were made up of individuals, and 11.0% had someone living alone who was 65 years of age or older.  The average household size was 2.67 and the average family size was 3.07.

In the town the population was spread out, with 29.7% under the age of 18, 9.2% from 18 to 24, 31.8% from 25 to 44, 17.6% from 45 to 64, and 11.6% who were 65 years of age or older.  The median age was 31 years. For every 100 females, there were 95.0 males.  For every 100 females age 18 and over, there were 87.2 males.

The median income for a household in the town was $33,125, and the median income for a family was $37,500. Males had a median income of $27,471 versus $18,864 for females. The per capita income for the town was $13,744.  About 7.0% of families and 11.1% of the population were below the poverty line, including 17.4% of those under age 18 and 18.7% of those age 65 or over.

References

External links
City of Brookland official website

Cities in Arkansas
Cities in Craighead County, Arkansas
Jonesboro metropolitan area